The Museum of Fine Arts (often abbreviated as MFA Boston or MFA) is an art museum in Boston, Massachusetts. It is the 20th-largest art museum in the world, measured by public gallery area. It contains 8,161 paintings and more than 450,000 works of art, making it one of the most comprehensive collections in the Americas. With more than 1.2 million visitors a year, it is the 52nd–most visited art museum in the world .

Founded in 1870 in Copley Square, the museum moved to its current Fenway location in 1909. It is affiliated with the School of the Museum of Fine Arts at Tufts.

History

1870–1907

The Museum of Fine Arts was founded in 1870 and was initially located on the top floor of the Boston Athenaeum. Most of its initial collection came from the Athenæum's Art Gallery. Francis Davis Millet, a local artist, was instrumental in starting the art school affiliated with the museum, and in appointing Emil Otto Grundmann as its first director. 

In 1876, the museum moved to a highly ornamented brick Gothic Revival building designed by John Hubbard Sturgis and Charles Brigham, noted for its massed architectural terracotta. It was located in Copley Square at Dartmouth and St. James Streets. It was built almost entirely of brick and terracotta, which was imported from England, with some stone about its base. 

After the MFA moved out in 1909, this original building was demolished, and the Copley Plaza Hotel (now the Fairmont Copley Plaza) replaced it in 1912.

1907–2007

In 1907, plans were laid to build a new home for the museum on Huntington Avenue in Boston's Fenway–Kenmore neighborhood, near the recently opened Isabella Stewart Gardner Museum. Museum trustees hired architect Guy Lowell to create a design for a museum that could be built in stages, as funding was obtained for each phase. Two years later, the first section of Lowell's neoclassical design was completed. It featured a  façade of granite and a grand rotunda. The museum moved to its new location in 1909.

The second phase of construction built a wing along The Fens to house paintings galleries. It was funded entirely by Maria Antoinette Evans Hunt, the wife of wealthy business magnate Robert Dawson Evans, and opened in 1915. From 1916 through 1925, the noted artist John Singer Sargent painted the frescoes that adorn the rotunda and the associated colonnades.

The Decorative Arts Wing was built in 1928, and expanded in 1968. An addition designed by Hugh Stubbins and Associates was built in 1966–1970, and another expansion by The Architects Collaborative opened in 1976. The West Wing, now the Linde Family Wing for Contemporary Art, was designed by I. M. Pei and opened in 1981. This wing now houses the museum's cafe, restaurant, meeting rooms, classrooms, and a giftshop/bookstore, as well as large exhibition spaces.

The Tenshin-En Japanese Garden designed by Kinsaku Nakane opened in 1988, and the Norma Jean Calderwood Garden Court and Terrace opened in 1997.

In 2007, the MFA announced its purchase of a nearby building then occupied by the Forsyth Institute, a dental and craniofacial research organization located at 140 The Fenway. The original Beaux Arts building dates from around 1910, and was later expanded with a Brutalist annex building. , the building is leased to nearby Northeastern University.

2008–present

In the mid-2000s, the museum launched a major effort to renovate and expand its facilities. In a seven-year fundraising campaign between 2001 and 2008 for a new wing, the endowment, and operating expenses, the museum managed to receive over $500 million, in addition to acquiring over $160 million worth of art.

During the global financial crisis between 2007 and 2012, the museum's annual budget was trimmed by $1.5 million. The museum increased revenues by organizing traveling exhibitions, which included a loan exhibition sent to the for-profit Bellagio in Las Vegas in exchange for $1 million. In 2011, Moody's Investors Service calculated that the museum had over $180 million in outstanding debt. However, the agency cited growing attendance, a large endowment, and positive cash flow as reasons to believe that the museum's finances would become stable in the near future.

In 2011, the museum put eight paintings by Monet, Renoir, Pissarro, Sisley, Gauguin, and others on sale at Sotheby's, bringing in a total of $21.6 million, to pay for Man at His Bath by Gustave Caillebotte at a cost reported to be more than $15 million.

A renovation included the new Art of the Americas Wing, featuring artwork from North, South, and Central America. In 2006, the groundbreaking ceremonies took place. The new wing and adjoining Ruth and Carl J. Shapiro Family Courtyard (a bright, cavernous interior space) were designed in a restrained, contemporary style by the London-based architectural firm Foster and Partners, under the directorship of Thomas T. Difraia and Childs Bertman Tseckares Architects (CBT). The landscape architecture firm Gustafson Guthrie Nichol redesigned the Huntington Avenue and Fenway entrances, gardens, access roads, and interior courtyards.

The wing opened on November 20, 2010, with free admission to the public. Mayor Thomas Menino declared it "Museum of Fine Arts Day", and more than 13,500 visitors attended the opening. In 2014, the Art of the Americas Wing was recognized for its high architectural achievement by the award of the Harleston Parker Medal, by the Boston Society of Architects.

In 2015, the museum renovated its outdoors Japanese garden, Tenshin-en. The garden, which originally opened in 1988, had been designed by Japanese professor Kinsaku Nakane. The garden's kabukimon-style entrance gate was built by Chris Hall of Massachusetts, using traditional Japanese carpentry techniques.

On March 12, 2020, the museum announced that it would close indefinitely due to the COVID-19 pandemic. All public events and programs were canceled until August 31, 2020. The museum reopened on September 26, 2020.

Collection

The Museum of Fine Arts possesses materials from a wide variety of art movements and cultures. The museum also maintains a large online database with information on over 346,000 items from its collection, accompanied with digitized images. Online search is freely available through the Internet.

Some highlights of the collection include:
 Ancient Egyptian artifacts including sculptures, sarcophagi, and jewelry
 Dutch Golden Age painting, including 113 works given in 2017 by collectors Rose-Marie and Eijk van Otterloo and Susan and Matthew Weatherbie. The gift includes works from 76 artists, as well as the Haverkamp-Begemann Library, a collection of more than 20,000 books, donated by the van Otterloos. The donors are also establishing a dedicated Netherlandish art center and scholarly institute at the museum.
 French impressionist and post-impressionist works by artists such as Paul Gauguin, Édouard Manet, Pierre-Auguste Renoir, Edgar Degas, Claude Monet, Camille Pissarro, Vincent van Gogh, and Paul Cézanne
 18th- and 19th-century American art, including many works by John Singleton Copley, Winslow Homer, John Singer Sargent, and Gilbert Stuart
 Chinese painting, calligraphy and imperial Chinese art
 The largest collection of Japanese artworks under one roof in the world outside Japan
 The Hartley Collection of almost 10,000 British illustrated books, prints and drawings from the late 19th century
 The Rothschild Collection, including over 130 objects from the Austrian branch of the Rothschild family. Donated by Bettina Burr and other heirs
 The Rockefeller collection of Native American work
The Linde Family Wing for Contemporary Art includes works by Kathy Butterly, Mona Hatoum, Jenny Holzer, Karen LaMonte, Ken Price, Martin Puryear, Doris Salcedo, and Andy Warhol.
A collection of over 1,100 historical music instruments, with selected items displayed in a dedicated music room, with occasional talks, live demonstrations, and concerts

Japanese art 

The collection of Japanese art at the Museum of Fine Arts is the largest in the world outside of Japan. Anne Nishimura Morse, the William and Helen Pounds Senior Curator of Japanese Art, oversees 100,000 total items that include 4,000 Japanese paintings, 5,000 ceramic pieces, and over 30,000 ukiyo-e prints.

The base of this collection was assembled in the late 19th century through the efforts of four men, Ernest Fenollosa, Kakuzo Okakura, William Sturgis Bigelow, and Edward Sylvester Morse, each of whom had spent time in Japan and admired Japanese art. Their combined donations account for up to 75 percent of the current collection. In 1890, the Museum of Fine Arts became the first museum in the United States to establish a collection and appoint a curator specifically for Japanese art.

Another notable part of this collection is a number of Buddhist statues. In the later Meiji era of Japan, around the turn of the 20th century, government policy deemphasizing Buddhism in favor of Shintoism and financial pressures on temples resulted in a number of Buddhist statues being sold to private collectors. Some of these statutes came into the collection of the Museum of Fine Arts. Today, these statues are the subject of preservation and restoration efforts, which have been at times viewable by the public in special exhibits. In recent years, the museum has also collected a number of works by contemporary Japanese artists. In 2011, they acquired Zetsu no. 8 (絶), the largest work in ceramicist Jun Nishida's Zetsu (絶) series.

Also important for this collection is the exhibition of its items in Japan. From 1999 to 2018, regular exchange of items was conducted between the Museum of Fine Arts and its sister museum, the now-closed Nagoya/Boston Museum of Fine Arts. In 2012, the traveling exhibition Japanese Masterpieces from the Museum of Fine Arts, Boston visited the Japanese cities of Tokyo, Nagoya, Osaka and Fukuoka, and was well received.

Libraries
The libraries at the Museum of Fine Arts consist of a main library, 8 curatorial departmental libraries, and the Center for Netherlandish Art Library. Collectively they hold over 450,000 items, including 60,000 art auction catalogs, and 150,000 periodicals and ephemera. The main branch, the William Morris Hunt Memorial Library, is named after the noted American artist. For 18 years, it had been located off-site in Horticultural Hall, two stops away on the MBTA Green Line. The main library had been open to the public, and the catalog could be searched online through the Fenway Libraries Online (FLO).

In 2021, the Horticultural Hall location was closed, in preparation for a move into the main MFA complex. The new entrance for the library is on the first floor of the museum near Sharf Information Center, in front of the Nina Saunders Suite. About a quarter of the collection was planned to be housed on the third floor of the museum along with the book conservation facilities, with the remainder stored off-site.

The main library is open to researchers a total of two separate 3-hour sessions per week, but only by appointment requested 2 weeks in advance, and subject to approval.

Exhibitions organized by the library staff in coordination with the School of the Museum of Fine Arts at Tufts have been debuted two to three times per year.

CAMEO
The Conservation and Art Materials Encyclopedia Online, (CAMEO) is a database that "compiles, defines, and disseminates technical information on the distinct collection of terms, materials, and techniques used in the fields of art conservation and historic preservation". CAMEO uses MediaWiki.

Community relations 
The MFA has gradually been expanding its programs of community outreach to people who have not been traditional visitors, and this trend accelerated after Matthew Teitelbaum was appointed as Director in 2015. This expansion has included improved accessibility for visitors who may be visually, audibly, or physically impaired. Special programming and tours are available for blind, ASL-fluent, cognitively-impaired, autistic, and medically-assisted guests. In addition, the MFA has welcomed LGBTQ visitors with exhibitions like Gender Bending Fashion (2019), and in spring 2019 it installed universally welcoming signage for restrooms.

Starting in July 2017, the MFA has offered a free one-year family membership to all newly naturalized US citizens under its "MFA Citizens" program.

The MFA publicly apologized in May 2019 after African-American and mixed-race 12- and 13-year-old visitors were allegedly targeted by employees and told "No food, no drink, and no watermelon", which is considered a racial slur in the US. A museum spokesperson said that the warning was actually "no water bottles", but conceded that there was no way of definitively proving what was actually said. Regardless, all museum staff dealing with school groups were to be retrained in interactions with their guests. The MFA also concluded that two of its members had been deliberately racist, and permanently banned them from visiting its grounds.

On October 14, 2019, the MFA debuted its newly renamed "Indigenous Peoples’ Day" (formerly Columbus Day) celebrations, with a focus on Native American art and culture. The events included special displays related to Cyrus Dallin’s 1908 Appeal to the Great Spirit, a popular and sometimes controversial sculpture of a Native American warrior located in front of the Huntington Avenue main entrance since 1912. Community comments and feedback concerning the monumental artwork were solicited and displayed. Earlier, in March 2019, the MFA had held a special public symposium to discuss the historical background and present-day significance of the iconic sculpture.

In 2020 the MFA had planned to offer 11 annual Community Celebrations, featuring free admission for all visitors, and special events such as dance performances, music, tours, craft demonstrations, and hands-on art making. This series included day-long Martin Luther King Jr. Day, Lunar New Year, Memorial Day, Highland Street Foundation Free Fun Friday, and Indigenous Peoples' Day celebrations. In addition, on Wednesday evenings, which were already free from 4pm to 10pm, special celebrations of Nowruz, Juneteenth, Latinx Heritage Night, ASL Night, Diwali, and Hanukkah were featured. However, this ambitious program of large community gatherings was curtailed by the COVID-19 pandemic and the March 2020 closure of the museum, followed by partially-restricted public access.

To commemorate its 150th anniversary, the MFA offered a free one-year family membership to anyone who attended one of its special Community Celebrations or MFA Late Nite programs during 2020. This "First Year Free Membership" program was available to anyone who had not previously been a member of the museum. The 150th year exhibitions included major shows and events featuring art by women and minority artists.

In November 2020 a significant number of MFA employees voted to unionize due to a long history of unaddressed issues related to workplace conditions and compensation inequities. The workers unionized with the local chapter of the United Auto Workers. After over 96% of the union agreed in a vote, MFA staff went on a strike for the first time on November 17, 2021. Union representatives cited unresponsive engagement from MFA management over multiple issues including stagnant wages, job security, and workplace diversity, as the reason for the strike. The union pointed out that employee wages had been frozen for two years, and that management had so far only offered a 1.75% percent raise over the course of four years. Union representatives contrasted this with MFA director Matthew Teitelbaum's salary which, clocking in at nearly 1 million USD, was almost 19 times larger than the average MFA worker.

In September 2022, as the MFA sought to recover from a precipitous drop in attendance caused by the COVID-19 pandemic, a new logo and branding campaign were announced, along with renewed community outreach efforts. These changes were announced in tandem with the opening of the traveling exhibition of an official portrait of former US president Barack Obama by Kehinde Wiley and the accompanying portrait of Michelle Obama by Amy Sherald, both on loan from the National Portrait Gallery in Washington DC.

Special exhibitions 
The Museum of Fine Arts, Boston, holds a lot of special exhibitions regularly with a duration always more than one month. The special exhibitions always exist only in a limited time and the exhibits included are often borrowed from other museums. This is one of MFA's features that attract tourists from inside the Boston area and other places worldwide.There have been about three exhibitions concurrently held each month at MFA since 1996. As of the end of 2022, the collection topic MFA special exhibits were divided into 13 categories: Africa and Oceania; Americas; Ancient Egypt, Nubia and the near East; Ancient Greece and Rome; Asia; Contemporary Art; Europe; Jewelry; Judaica; Musical Instruments; Photography; Prints and Drawings; and Textile and Fashion Arts. Most special exhibitions take place at the following galleries: Edward and Nancy Roberts Family Gallery, Linde Family Wing for Contemporary Art, Ann and Graham Gund Gallery, Edward H. Linde Gallery. The exhibitions are usually opens to public with a variety of pricing on tickets.

Philip Guston Now 
Philip Guston Now is an exhibition organized by the Museum of Fine Arts, Boston; the National Gallery of Art, Washington; the Museum of Fine Arts, Houston; and Tate Modern, London. This show is also considered as America’s most controversial art exhibition, as of May, 2022. Its controversies are mainly because much of his work addresses and confronts topics such as white supremacy, racism, anti-Semitism, and violence. It was originally planned to open in June of 2020, due to nationwide protests for racial equality, it was postponed to open at May. 1, 2022. The museums were aware of its controversies, so they opened a comment area on their official website for the public to share their thoughts with the museum.

Highlights
Among the many notable works in the collection, the following examples are in the public domain and have photographs available:

American

European

Antiquities

Notable people

Directors
Emil Otto Grundmann – first Director
Edward Robinson – second Director
Arthur Fairbanks – third Director
George Harold Edgell – fifth Director
Perry T. Rathbone – sixth Director
Merrill C. Rueppel – seventh Director
Jan Fontein – eighth Director
Alan Shestack – ninth Director
Morton Golden – interim Director 1993–1994
Malcolm Rogers – tenth Director
Matthew Teitelbaum – eleventh Director

Curators
Sylvester Rosa Koehler – first Curator of Prints (1887–1900)
Ernest Fenollosa – Curator of Oriental Art (1890–1896)
Benjamin Ives Gilman – Curator (1893–1894?); Librarian (1893–1904); Secretary (1894–1925) Assistant Director (1901–1903); Temporary Director (1907)
Albert Lythgoe – first Curator of Egyptian Art (1902–1906)
Okakura Kakuzō – Curator of Oriental Art (1904–1913)
Fitzroy Carrington – Curator of Prints (1912–1921)
Ananda Coomaraswamy – Curator of Oriental Art (1917–1933)
William George Constable – Curator of Paintings (1938–1957)
Cornelius Clarkson Vermeule III – Curator of Classical Art (1957–1996)
Jonathan Leo Fairbanks – Curator of American Decorative Arts and Sculpture (1970–1999)
Theodore Stebbins – Curator of American Paintings (1977–1999)
Anne Poulet – Curator of Sculpture and Decorative Arts (1979–1999)

Bulletin 
A bulletin appeared under various titles from 1903 to 1983:

 1903–1925: Museum of Fine Arts Bulletin
 1926–1965: Bulletin of the Museum of Fine Arts
 1966–1977: Boston Museum Bulletin
 1978–1980: MFA Bulletin
 1981–1983: M Bulletin (Museum of Fine Arts, Boston)

See also
 List of most-visited museums in the United States
 The Lonely Palette (art history podcast hosted by MFA lecturer Tamar Avishai)
 Nagoya/Boston Museum of Fine Arts (defunct sister institution in Nagoya, Japan)
 School of the Museum of Fine Arts at Tufts

References

External links
Official site
Virtual tour of the Museum of Fine Arts, Boston provided by Google Arts & Culture

 
1870 establishments in Massachusetts
Art museums established in 1870
Art museums and galleries in Massachusetts
Asian art museums in the United States
Cultural infrastructure completed in 1909
Culture of Boston
Egyptological collections in the United States
Fenway–Kenmore
Institutions accredited by the American Alliance of Museums
Landmarks in Fenway–Kenmore
Mesoamerican art museums in the United States
Museums in Boston
Museums of American art
Museums of ancient Greece in the United States
Museums of Ancient Near East in the United States
Museums of ancient Rome in the United States
Museums of Japanese culture abroad in the United States
African art museums in the United States